Hamuliakovo is a village and municipality located in the Senec District, Bratislava Region, Slovakia.

Geography
The municipality lies at an altitude of 129 metres and covers an area of 10.947 km2.

History
In historical records, the village was first mentioned in 1284. After the Austro-Hungarian army disintegrated in November 1918, Czechoslovak troops occupied the area, later acknowledged internationally by the Treaty of Trianon. Between 1938 and 1945, Hamuliakovo once more became part of Miklós Horthy's Hungary through the First Vienna Award. From 1945 until the Velvet Divorce in 1993, it was part of Czechoslovakia. Since then, it has been part of Slovakia.

Population
According to the 2011 census, the municipality had 1,438 inhabitants. 894 of inhabitants were Slovaks, 504 Hungarians and 40 others and unspecified.

Demographics

Population by nationality:

Twin towns — sister cities

Hamuliakovo is twinned with:
 Deutsch Jahrndorf, Austria 
 Kerekegyháza, Hungary
 Rajka, Hungary

See also
List of municipalities and towns in Slovakia

References

Genealogical resources
The records for genealogical research are available at the state archive "Státný archiv in Bratislava, Slovakia"

 Roman Catholic church records (births/marriages/deaths): 1672-1896 (parish B)

External links/Sources

 Official page
https://web.archive.org/web/20070513023228/http://www.statistics.sk/mosmis/eng/run.html
Surnames of living people in Hamuliakovo

Villages and municipalities in Senec District
Hungarian communities in Slovakia